Dina Vierny (25 January 1919 – 20 January 2009) was an artists' model who became a singer, French art dealer, collector and museum director.

Born as Dina Aibinder into a Jewish family in Kishinev, Bessarabia (now Chișinău, Moldova), she was Aristide Maillol's muse for the last ten years of his life. Both Matisse and Bonnard, artists for whom she also posed, attributed a renewed inspiration for painting and sculpture to Vierny.

Death
Vierny died in Paris, five days before her 90th birthday. She was survived by her two sons, Olivier Lorquin, director of the Musée Maillol in Paris, and art historian Bertrand Lorquin, the museum's curator.

References

External links
 Vierny's obit in NY Times 
 New York Times article: A Sculptor's Obsession, A Model's Devotion

1919 births
2009 deaths
Musicians from Chișinău
French people of Romanian-Jewish descent
French artists' models
French female models
French art dealers
Jewish art collectors
French art collectors
Women art collectors
Women museum directors
French art curators
Museum founders
Muses
Moldovan emigrants to France
20th-century French women